Wildlife Control may refer to:

Wildlife Control (band), an American indie rock band from Brooklyn, NY and San Francisco, CA
 Nuisance wildlife management, the term given to the process of selective removal of problem individuals or populations of certain species of wildlife

See also
Wildlife Services, a program that provides Federal leadership and skill to resolve wildlife interactions that threaten public health and safety
Wildlife management attempts to balance the needs of wildlife with the needs of people using the best available science